Joseph M. "Mike" Seymour (born April 15, 1959) is an American politician who has served in the Mississippi State Senate from the 47th district since 2016.

References

1959 births
Living people
Republican Party Mississippi state senators
21st-century American politicians